Ōhope, until 1974 known as Ohope Beach, is a beach settlement in the  eastern Bay of Plenty, on the northeast coast of the North Island of New Zealand, six kilometres east and over the hill, from Whakatāne.

Name
On 10 October 1974, the name of the settlement was formally changed from Ohope Beach to Ohope. 
On 21 June 2019, the official name of the town was changed to Ōhope (with a macron) by the New Zealand Geographic Board.

Demographics

Ōhope had a population of 3,177 at the 2018 New Zealand census, an increase of 330 people (11.6%) since the 2013 census, and an increase of 324 people (11.4%) since the 2006 census. There were 1,350 households, comprising 1,545 males and 1,632 females, giving a sex ratio of 0.95 males per female. The median age was 51.8 years (compared with 37.4 years nationally), with 498 people (15.7%) aged under 15 years, 378 (11.9%) aged 15 to 29, 1,410 (44.4%) aged 30 to 64, and 891 (28.0%) aged 65 or older.

Ethnicities were 89.6% European/Pākehā, 14.9% Māori, 1.0% Pacific peoples, 3.2% Asian, and 2.5% other ethnicities. People may identify with more than one ethnicity.

The percentage of people born overseas was 22.3, compared with 27.1% nationally.

Although some people chose not to answer the census's question about religious affiliation, 51.4% had no religion, 37.2% were Christian, 0.7% had Māori religious beliefs, 0.6% were Hindu, 0.2% were Muslim, 0.6% were Buddhist and 0.9% had other religions.

Of those at least 15 years old, 771 (28.8%) people had a bachelor's or higher degree, and 366 (13.7%) people had no formal qualifications. The median income was $36,600, compared with $31,800 nationally. 624 people (23.3%) earned over $70,000 compared to 17.2% nationally. The employment status of those at least 15 was that 1,215 (45.4%) people were employed full-time, 438 (16.3%) were part-time, and 60 (2.2%) were unemployed.

Holiday destination
It is a popular holiday destination during the New Zealand summer, with several kilometres of safe swimming beaches. The western end of the beach is popular for surfing during the summer and Christmas period.

Town facilities
Ōhope is home to the Ohope Beach Primary School, which has five classrooms.

Gallery

References

External links
 Coastal Reserves and Beaches, Whakatane District Council

Whakatane District
Beaches of the Bay of Plenty Region
Tourist attractions in the Bay of Plenty Region
Populated places in the Bay of Plenty Region